Roman Catholic Kshatriyas (also simply Cxatrias in Romi Konkani, Indo-Portuguese& Indian English) are a modern Christianised caste among Goan, Bombay East Indian, Mangalorean, Kudali& Karwari Catholics. They are the patrilineal descendants of Kshatriya and Vaishya Vani converts to the Latin Church, in parts of the Konkan region that were under Portuguese Goan rule. They are known as Chardo (Devanagari Konkani; चारड्डो) in Goan Konkani, Charodi (Kanarese script; ಚರೋಡಿ; Tsāroḍi) in Canarese Konkani & as Sandori or Vadval in Damanese and Mahraashtrian Konknni, while others also identify as Bhandari or Khatri in the Bombay East Indian dialect. The well known households and well to do individuals among them, have mostly been endogamous.

Etymology
The precise etymology of the word Chardo is unclear. Two most probable explanations are as follows:
 The roots of this Konkani word is said to lie in the Prakrit word Chavda, which is the name of a dynasty who are said to have migrated to Old Goa from Saurashtra in the 7th and 8th centuries, after their kingdom was destroyed by the Sunni Caliphate's conquest in around 740 AD.
 Another explanation given by historian B.D. Satoskar is that the Konkani word comes from the Sanskrit word Chatur-rathi or the Prakrit Chau-radi, which literally means "the ones who ride a chariot yoked with four horses".

Origins
Kshatriyas of the Konkan region were composed of landlords and the warrior class, they ranked second in the Hindu Varna system. Those who were into trading by profession, were known as Chattim, which was an occupational appellation common to Brahmans as well. The origins of this Christian caste can be traced back to the Christianisation of the Velhas Conquistas by the Portuguese East Indies during the 16th and 17th centuries. Missionaries of the Jesuit, Franciscan & Dominican Orders converted many Kshatriyas to Christianity. The caste appellation of Chardo eventually fell into disuse among the remaining few Hindu Kshatriyas, who began calling themselves Maratha, in order to differentiate themselves from those Kshatriyas who had embraced Christianity and to also align themselves with the ascendant Hindu Mahrattas in the neighbouring Mahratta Confederacy. The Kshatriyas and Vaishya Vanis, who were among the last to convert, were incorporated into the Chardo caste.

The earliest known instance of Goan Kshatriya conversions to Christianity took place in 1560, when 700 Kshatriyas were baptised en masse at Carambolim in Tiswadi. Their decision to embrace Christianity was made after deliberation of the village assembly, and came about as they were subjects of the Portuguese government. Another instance of a Kshatriya group of 200 members being baptized en masse at Batim in Bardez, in August, 1560; the event is mentioned in a letter of a Jesuit missionary, Luís Fróis, dated 13 November 1560.

The Charodis form the second largest group in the Mangalorean Catholic community. In South Canara, many Charodis took up service in the army of the Keladi Nayakas, and came to constitute the bulk of the Christian soldiers in their army. The Lewis-Naik family of Kallianpur near Udupi, produced many distinguished soldiers and officers in the Keladi army. In recognition of their service, the Nayakas rewarded them with large tracts of land in Kallianpur. During the Indian independence struggle, Chardos were perceived by Indian nationalists to be more sympathetic to Indian nationalist leanings and less likely to be pro-European loyalists than Bamonns. 

The Chardos have generally been an endogamous group, so they did not inter-marry or mingle with lower castes, while the statutes and norms of the Roman Catholic Church and the Portuguese authorities prevented them from discriminating against the latter. Padvals are a subcaste within Roman Catholic Cxatrias of Jain Bunt origin.

See also

Christian Raajputs
Reddy Catholics
Christianisation of Goa
Christianity in Goa
Christianity in Karnataka
Christianity in Maharashtra
Christianity in Damaon
Christianity in Gujarat
Cuncolim Revolt
Roman Catholicism in Goa
Roman Catholicism in Mangalore
Roman Catholicism in Bombay

Citations

References

.
.

.
.

.

Further reading

.

Goan society
Mangalorean society
Christian communities of India
Social groups of Goa
Social groups of Karnataka
Social groups of Maharashtra
Castes
 
Mangalorean Catholics 
Vasai-Virar
 History of Mumbai
History of Christianity in India
Indian Christians
Social groups of India